Pavel Grigoryevich Chukhray (Bykovo, Moscow Oblast, October 14, 1946) is a Soviet and Russian film director and screenwriter. He is the son of the prominent Russian film director Grigory Chukhray.

He is best known for his film The Thief (1997), which was nominated for a Golden Globe Award and an Academy Award for Best Foreign Language Film[1] and won the Nika Award for Best Picture and Best Directing. He is a People's Artist of Russia. He has been nominated and won numerous international prizes in Russia, Europe and the United States, including the Venice Film Festival.

Steven Spielberg invited Pavel Chukhray to participate in his project: “Broken Silence” (2002), an international documentary mini-series about the holocaust. The series consists of five foreign-language films featuring testimonies from Argentina, the Czech Republic, Hungary, Poland, and Russia and directed by distinguished filmmakers from each of these countries. Pavel Chukhray directed the segment "Children from the Abyss," detailing the experience of Holocaust survivors and their resistance, betrayal, rescue, and the desire for revenge in this Russian-language documentary. The film series was subtitled into 11 languages (including English) and has aired on television in 18 countries worldwide.

In 2007, Chukhray adapted a novel by Nikolai Gogol to film, resulting in a production called The Russian Game, about an Italian card sharper who is hounded by creditors and travels to Russia to hustle some quick money. On his way, he meets a group of Russian gamblers that sympathize with his situation and agree to collaborate with him.

Early life 
Pavel Grigoryevich Chukhray was born in Bykovo, Ramensky district, Moscow Oblast. His mother was a teacher—she taught Russian language and Literature. His father was the film director Grigory Chukhray. When Pavel was seven, his father began working at Dovzhenko Film Studios, and the family moved to Kiev. He grew up surrounded by family friends who were talented film makers, including Mark Donskoy, and the young and not yet well-known Sergei Parajanov, Aleksandr Alov, and Vladimir Naumov. When he was nine, Chukhray and his family moved to Moscow. At the age of 16, he began working for the Russian film studio Mosfilm. In 1964, he went to VGIK (All-Union State Institute of Cinematography) studying to become a cinematographer. He continued on to directing, receiving his diploma in 1974.

Chukray's directorial debut was You Should Sometimes Remember (1977), starring Nikolai Kryuchkov. He wrote and directed his second film, People in the Ocean (1980), which was a popular and critical success and won him many awards in Russia, including the Dovzhenko Award. His third film, A Canary Cage (1983), which he both wrote and directed played at the Cannes Film Festival and elsewhere. His eighth film, The Thief (1997), brought him success internationally. It was one of the top three box office hits in Russia, and was nominated internationally for many awards including an Oscar and a Golden Globe.

Personal life 
Pavel Grigoryevich Chukhray's first wife is the actress Alyona Chukhray. His second wife is the screenwriter Maria Zvereva. He has two daughters and four grandchildren.

His daughter Anastasia is married to the businessman Alexey M. Reznikovich.

Filmography 

Documentaries:

References

External links

Pavel Chukhray's The Russian Game at Eurochannel

1946 births
20th-century Russian screenwriters
Male screenwriters
20th-century Russian male writers
21st-century Russian screenwriters
Living people
People from Ramensky District
Academicians of the Russian Academy of Cinema Arts and Sciences "Nika"
People's Artists of Russia
Recipients of the Lenin Komsomol Prize
Recipients of the Nika Award
Recipients of the Order of Honour (Russia)
Russian people of Ukrainian descent
Russian film directors
Soviet film directors
Soviet screenwriters
Russian activists against the 2022 Russian invasion of Ukraine